Boniface Campbell (September 27, 1895 – March 25, 1988) was a United States Army Major General.

He was commander of V Corps in 1951. In 1953 he was commandant of Fort Holabird, in the Army Counterintelligence Corps.

In April 1957, he was awarded a Bronze Oak Leaf Cluster in lieu of a Second Award of the Legion of Merit for "exceptionally meritorious conduct in the performance of outstanding services to the Government of the United States from November 1945 to December 1956".

He was the eldest son of the film director Colin Campbell.

References

External links
Generals of World War II
United States Army Officers 1939−1945

1895 births
1988 deaths
Recipients of the Legion of Merit
United States Army personnel of World War I
United States Army generals of World War II
United States Army generals
United States Army Infantry Branch personnel